Anna Theodora Bernardina "Ank" Bijleveld-Schouten (born 17 March 1962) is a Dutch politician of the Christian Democratic Appeal (CDA) who has been serving as acting mayor of Almere since 10 January 2022. She served as Minister of Defence in the third cabinet of Prime Minister Mark Rutte from 26 October 2017 to 17 September 2021.

A civil servant by occupation, she served as a member of the House of Representatives from 16 November 1989 until 16 January 2001, when she was appointed Mayor of Hof van Twente, serving from 1 January 2001 until 22 February 2007. She resigned after she was appointed as State Secretary for the Interior and Kingdom Relations in the Fourth Balkenende cabinet, serving from 22 February 2007 until 14 October 2010. After the election of 2010, Bijleveld returned to the House of Representatives serving from 17 June 2010 until 1 January 2011 when she resigned after she was appointed as King's Commissioner of Overijssel. Following the election of 2017 Bijleveld was asked to become Minister of Defence in the Third Rutte cabinet. Bijleveld accepted and resigned as King's Commissioner of Overijssel the same day she took office as the new Minister of Defence on 26 October 2017.

Early life and education
Bijleveld was born in the Dutch province of Overijssel. Between 1980 and 1986, she studied public administration at the University of Twente.

Political career
In 1986 Bijleveld became a member of the Enschede municipal council for the Christian Democratic Appeal. She served as a Member of the House of Representatives from 16 November 1989 until 16 January 2001. She was Mayor of Hof van Twente from 1 January 2001 until 22 February 2007, when she resigned to become the State secretary for the Interior and Kingdom Relations in the Fourth Balkenende cabinet until 14 October 2010. On 17 June 2010 she again became a member of the House of Representatives. She was an MP till 1 January 2011 when she became King's Commissioner of Overijssel.

Minister of Defence, 2017–2021
Bijleveld left that position in 2017 as she was appointed to be Minister of Defence.

Early in her tenure, Bijleveld oversaw Dutch efforts to disrupt a 2018 attempt by Russian intelligence agents to hack the Organisation for the Prohibition of Chemical Weapons (OPCW).

In October 2019, journalists from NRC and NOS revealed that an air raid on the Iraqi city Hawija in early June 2015 had been carried out by Dutch F16s. This bombing of a weapons depot resulted in 70 civilian deaths. Bijleveld's predecessor, Jeanine Hennis-Plasschaert, was aware of this, but had incorrectly informed the House of Representatives about this. Bijleveld was criticized, because she too could have informed the House of Representatives about this earlier. For this reason  GroenLinks-parliamentarian Isabelle Diks filed a motion of no confidence on 5 November 2019, which was supported by 71 parliamentarians. In this parliamentary debate Rutte and Bijleveld stated that the number of seventy civilian deaths was uncertain and that this was also not known to the United States Central Command. After inquiries from NRC and NOS, United States Central Command however confirmed that they have known this number of casualties for a while now. The fact that journalists could get this information led to a fourth debate about this bombing. In this debate, Bijleveld survived another vote of no confidence, which was supported by only 69 parliamentarians.

Bijleveld resigned on 17 September 2021 after the House of Representatives filed a motion of disapproval on how she and Sigrid Kaag handled the evacuation of Afghanistan, even though the day before she said she wouldn't resign.

Electoral history

Personal life
Bijleveld has been married to Riekele Bijleveld since 1984 (her husband has been a member of the municipal council of Hof van Twente on behalf of the CDA party since 2018) and has two daughters. She is a Roman Catholic.

References

External links
Official

  Drs. A.Th.B. (Ank) Bijleveld-Schouten Parlement.com

(acting)

1962 births
Living people
20th-century Dutch civil servants
20th-century Dutch politicians
20th-century Dutch women politicians
21st-century Dutch civil servants
21st-century Dutch politicians
21st-century Dutch women politicians
Christian Democratic Appeal politicians
Dutch Roman Catholics
Female defence ministers
King's and Queen's Commissioners of Overijssel
Mayors in Overijssel
Mayors of Almere
Members of the House of Representatives (Netherlands)
Ministers of Defence of the Netherlands
Ministers without portfolio of the Netherlands
Municipal councillors of Enschede
Officers of the Order of Orange-Nassau
People from Hof van Twente
People from Kampen, Overijssel
State Secretaries for the Interior of the Netherlands
University of Twente alumni
Women government ministers of the Netherlands
Women King's and Queen's Commissioners of the Netherlands
Women mayors of places in the Netherlands